Mark Hanson (born 1946) is a former American Evangelical bishop.

Mark Hanson may also refer to:

Mark Hanson, birth name of Hamza Yusuf, American Islamic scholar
Mark Hanson, Democratic candidate in the California State Senate election, 2006
Mark Hanson, character in Willed to Kill, played by Dylan Bruce
Mark Hanson, character in Portrait of a Stripper played by K. C. Martel

See also
Mark Hansen (disambiguation)